Eniola Olamilekan Adedeji, known by his stage name DJ Enimoney, is a Nigerian disc jockey. Enimoney is the official disc jockey of YBNL Nation and younger brother of Nigerian rapper, Olamide.

Early life 
DJ Enimoney was born in Lagos to Nigerian parents. He pursued a high school education at Lagos State Secondary School. He studied Computer science at Lagos City Polytechnic.

Career 
DJ Enimoney  started his professional disc jockey career after senior secondary school in 2015 at Bariga. He gained recognition in 2016 with his debut single "Oya dab" which featured Olamide.

At the 2018 edition of the City People Music Awards, held in Lagos, DJ Enimoney single "Diet" which features Tiwa Savage & Slimcase won "Best Collaboration of the Year". That same year, he was nominated at the Nigerian Entertainment Award for "Diet" in the "Best Single by DJ" category.

Discography

Singles 
"Gapa" (featuring CDQ (rapper), Chinko Ekun  and B Banks) (2015)
"Sweety gurl" (featuring Small Doctor and Dresan) (2016)
"Spending cash" (featuring 2Sec]) (2016)
"People Talk Alot (P.T.A)" (featuring Olamide and Pheelz) (2016)
"Oya dab" (featuring Olamide) (2016)
"Wapka Me" (2017)
"Send Her Money"(featuring Olamide, Kizz Daniel, LK Kuddy and Kranium) (2018)
"Diet" (featuring Tiwa Savage, Reminisce and Slimcase) (2018)
"Ogede" (featuring Reekado Banks) (2019)
"Sugar Daddy" (featuring Olamide) (2021)

Awards and nominations

See also 
List of Nigerian DJs

References 

Living people
Nigerian DJs
Nigerian hip hop DJs
People from Lagos State
Yoruba musicians
Year of birth missing (living people)